is a Japanese football player. He plays for Tochigi City FC.

Club statistics
Updated to end of 2018 season.

Honours

International
Japan U-19
 AFF U-19 Youth Championship Winners (1) : 2014

References

External links
Profile at Shonan Bellmare

1996 births
Living people
Association football people from Tokushima Prefecture
Japanese footballers
J1 League players
J2 League players
Ehime FC players
Shonan Bellmare players
Tokushima Vortis players
Matsumoto Yamaga FC players
Tochigi City FC players
Association football forwards